Anupgarh canal is the canal which irrigates agriculture land in the south part of Shri Ganganagar district and north west of Bikaner district of western India.

It is the main source of drinking water in this area.

Origination
It originates near Suratgarh from Indira Gandhi Canal.

Irrigation
It irrigates agriculture lands of Suratgarh tehsil, Vijaynagar tehsil, Anupgarh tehsil, Ghrsana tehsil and Khajuwala tehsil, and other land.

External links
 Anupgarh canal:discover with photos  अनूपगढ नहर की  yatra

References 

Sri Ganganagar district
Bikaner district
Canals in Rajasthan